Josephus Beek SJ (Joop or Jopie) (12 March 1917 in Amsterdam – 17 September 1983 in Jakarta) was a Dutch and later Indonesian Jesuit, priest, educator and politician. From approximately 1965 until approximately 1975 he was a very important political consultant to the Indonesian president Suharto, but always remained in the shade. 

Joop Beek grew up in Amsterdam in a family with Indonesian connections. In 1935, he entered the Jesuit order in Mariëndaal in Grave in the Netherlands . In 1938, as was usual in this religious order, he was transferred to work in a Jesuit college, in his case in Yogyakarta, Indonesia. During the Second World War he was interned by the Japanese until 1945, and come liberation he was held for seven more months by the Indonesians. In 1946, he returned to the Netherlands, to Maastricht, to study for priesthood, was ordained in 1948 and again sent to Yogyakarta, where he stayed until 1959. Here he also started setting up catholic student organisations, that would prove the basis for his later political influence.

Leadership training KASBUL
In 1960, father Beek started work in Jakarta, where he became increasingly convinced of the danger of the communists in Indonesia, especially to the Catholics. He set up intensive leadership training lasting a month, under the name KASBUL (Kaderisasi Sebulan), on strict ascetic principles and with some excessive punishments. This was successful and formed a generation of militant anti-communist and anti-Islamic and loyal catholic leaders, trained in leadership, speaking in public, writing, group dynamics and social analysis. The students also learned to recognise communist tactics and how to counter them.

Anti-communist
The leadership training provided the basis for an information network with a cellular system and for contacts with political leaders, such as the then president Sukarno and the later president, the pro-western general Suharto. A rift with Sukarno developed because of his increasingly communist preferences. In 1965, a coup attempt was made and six pro-Sukarno generals were assassinated.

The coup failed and Father Beek sent his well-organized students into the streets to demonstrate against the Communists . Suharto increased his powers quickly and could eventually oust Sukarno and eliminate the communists in a very bloody witch hunt, that cost at least some 500,000 lives and tens of thousands of prisoners, among which Pramoedya Ananta Toer, the writer who described his many years in prison on the island of Buru. Suharto became president and father Beek his main advisor, up to approximately 1975. Father Beek then had already taken Indonesian citizenship.

A Dutch TV-reporter, Aad van den Heuvel worked for the KRO Brandpunt news programme and met father Beek in Indonesia several times. In his novel 'Stenen Tijdperk'*Stone Age) he introduces a character that is based upon father Beek. At one visit, Van den Heuvel recalled in a VPRO radio-documentary on father Beek, that he and his colleague Ed van Westerloo spoke with the father late in the sixties about a speech that they understood general Suharto would be giving later, and asked the father if he knew what it would be about. 'I don't know, I'm still writing it', father Beek replied.

Anti-Islamic CSIS
Already from the beginning father Beek considered the Communists and the Islam as the largest enemies of the Catholics in Indonesia. The Communists eliminated, he could anticipate on Suharto's fear for political dominance by the numerically predominating Muslims. Father Beek incited Suharto into founding the Golkar, a political party which leaned on non-Islamic middle classes and Catholics and was meant to keep the Muslims under control. Father Beek also supported the establishment by his former student Lim Bian Kie (also known as Jusuf Wanandi) of the CSIS (Center for Strategic & International study), a seeming-scientific Indonesian think-tank which would form the main connection between father Beek's movement and the government. The rich Wanandi family still supports this institute.

Influence
Several sources point to the vast influence father Beek had through his students, that were often successful in obtaining important positions in the administration, government or the business world. One of the best known is Cosmas Batubara, who became a government minister, and also Lim Bian Kie (also known as Jusuf Wanandi).

Father Beek eliminated the Islamic political party, which may have resulted in increased Islamic fundamentalism.

Notes

References

 Feeling Threatened, Muslim-Christian Relations in Indonesia' s New order: by Mujiburrahman, Amsterdam University Press, 2006, 428 pages
 Sukarno and the Indonesian coup: The Untold Story, by Helen-Louise Hunter, PSI reports, 2007
 Soedarmanta, J. B., Pater Beek, SJ: Larut Tetapi Tidak Hanyut ("Father Beek SJ: Dissolved, but Not Drowned"), Yayasan Obor Indonesia, Jakarta (2008)
 Pater Joop Beek, de man achter Soeharto Hilversum, VPRO radio history (Dutch), 1 February 2009

External links
 http://geschiedenis.vpro.nl/artikelen/41290181/

1917 births
1983 deaths
20th-century Dutch Jesuits
Dutch expatriates in Indonesia
Indonesian Jesuits
New Order (Indonesia)
Clergy from Amsterdam